William Walters (died 1417) was a cloth merchant and the member of the Parliament of England for Salisbury for the parliament of 1399. He was also reeve and mayor or Salisbury.

References 

Members of Parliament for Salisbury
English MPs 1399
Year of birth unknown
1417 deaths
Reeves (England)
Mayors of Salisbury
Cloth merchants
English merchants